Lepturges vogti is a species of longhorn beetles of the subfamily Lamiinae. It was described by Hovore and Tyson in 1983.

References

Lepturges
Beetles described in 1983